Ismael Benegas Arévalos (born 1 August 1987 in Zeballos Cué) is a Paraguayan footballer who currently plays for Club Jorge Wilstermann.

External links

1987 births
Living people
Paraguayan footballers
Paraguayan expatriate footballers
Association football defenders
Club Libertad footballers
Club Rubio Ñu footballers
Quilmes Atlético Club footballers
Club Atlético Colón footballers
Club Nacional de Football players
San Martín de Tucumán footballers
Club Guaraní players
C.D. Jorge Wilstermann players
Argentine Primera División players
Uruguayan Primera División players
Primera Nacional players
Paraguayan Primera División players
Bolivian Primera División players
Expatriate footballers in Argentina
Expatriate footballers in Uruguay
Expatriate footballers in Bolivia
Paraguayan expatriate sportspeople in Argentina
Paraguayan expatriate sportspeople in Uruguay
Paraguayan expatriate sportspeople in Bolivia